26 a Go Go is Flow's ninth studio album. The album comes into two editions: regular and limited. The limited edition includes a bonus DVD. It reached #36 on the Oricon charts  and charted for 3 weeks.

Track listing

Bonus DVD Track listing

References

Flow (band) albums
2014 albums